Jefferson Rowe Thompson, known as Jeff R. Thompson (born March 10, 1965), is a judge Louisiana's Second Circuit Court of Appeal, previously served as a district judge for the 26th Judicial District Court for Bossier and Webster parishes, who is a Republican former member of the Louisiana House of Representatives for District 8, a position which he held from January 2012 to January 2015.

In a special election on March 30, 2019, he was elected with 76% of the vote to the Second Circuit Court of Appeal for the remainder of an unexpired term.  In November, 2020, he was elected without opposition to a full 10-year term at the Second Circuit Court of Appeal, which serves Louisiana's twenty northernmost parishes from Texas to Mississippi.

Background

Political life

Thompson was elected to the House in 2011, when the term-limited incumbent, fellow Republican Jane H. Smith of Bossier City, ran instead, unsuccessfully, for the Louisiana State Senate. Thompson defeated fellow Republican, Michael Durrell "Duke" Lowrie (born April 1970), 4,991 (56.8 percent) to 3,803 (43.3 percent). Smith, meanwhile, was defeated by the Republican businessman Barrow Peacock of Shreveport for the Senate seat vacated by B. L. "Buddy" Shaw.

In 2008, Thompson was an unsuccessful candidate for the United States House of Representatives for Louisiana's 4th congressional district. The seat opened when the incumbent Jim McCrery stepped down to become a lobbyist. Thompson finished in third place in the primary. The position went to the Republican physician and businessman John C. Fleming of Minden, who held it until 2017.

In the spring of 2012, Representative Thompson amended an anti-bullying bill sponsored by Patricia Smith, a Democrat from Baton Rouge. Conservative opponents of the bill claimed the measure is at odds with freedom of speech rulings by the United States Supreme Court. Thompson offered an amendment, which removed those sections of the bill that specify prohibitions against bullying in regard to only sexual orientation, disabilities, and race. Smith said that the Thompson amendment effectively killed the focus of the legislation, and she withdrew it from further consideration.  Thompson opposed bullying in schools for any reason and worked to protect the educational opportunities of all children.

Representative Thompson served on the House Education, Homeland Security, Ways and Means, and Military and Veterans Affairs committees. He also sits on the Joint House and Senate Committee on Homeland Security.  Thompson was a leader in the Louisiana legislature to address the over 17 million pounds of propellant improperly and illegally stored at Camp Minden near Doyline, Louisiana.

Mike Johnson,was later elected to the US House of Representatives for Louisiana’s 4th congressional district.

Court activities

References

 

1965 births
Living people
Politicians from Alexandria, Louisiana
Politicians from Monroe, Louisiana
University of Louisiana at Monroe alumni
Tulane University Law School alumni
Louisiana lawyers
Insurance agents
Republican Party members of the Louisiana House of Representatives
Louisiana state court judges
Politicians from Bossier City, Louisiana
Baptists from Louisiana
People from Benton, Louisiana